Pilditch is a surname. Notable people with the surname include:

Gerald Pilditch (1892–1956), South African World War I flying ace
Philip Pilditch (1861–1948), British architect and politician

See also
Pilditch baronets
Pilditch Stadium